Edoardo Purgatori a.k.a. Edoardo Hendrik (Rome, January 14, 1989) is an actor.

Biography 
Edoardo Purgatori (a.k.a. Edoardo Hendrik) was born in Rome in 1989 to Andrea Purgatori, an Italian journalist and screenwriter, and to Nicola Schmitz, a German art historian and actress. Edoardo is the eldest of three children and since kindergarten he attended the German School of Rome, where he began to cultivate a passion for acting when becoming a part of the school's theater company. Over eight years the company produced a series of shows like Les Misérables, Tartuffe, Dance of the Vampires and Rabbit Rabbit. Edoardo played many leading roles in these productions.
During his final years at school, at the age of eighteen, Edoardo started to take acting classes with Actors Studio Members Danny Lemmo and Dominique De Fazio.

In 2007 Edoardo made his professional debut in the television drama Donna Detective directed by Cinzia Th. Torrini. In a short time more television roles followed with directors Ricky Tognazzi, Alberto Sironi and Luigi Perelli, for Italy's national public broadcasting company, Radio Televisione Italiana (RAI).

In 2008 he shortly attended the University LUISS Guido Carli in Rome, where he studied international relations before moving to England to further pursue his acting training.
In London he studied with private teachers and attended courses at the Actor’s Temple.
After several auditions he joined the Oxford School of Drama where he completed the Foundation Course in Acting.

In 2010 Edoardo became an active member of the Studio De Fazio in Rome, under the artistic direction of Dominique De Fazio (Actors Studio).

In 2012 Edoardo starred in many independent short films as well as the RAI TV film, Anita Garibaldi, where he played historical figure Nino Bixio, directed by Claudio Bonivento.

In 2013 he played the starring role in the English productions The Glass Menagerie by Tennessee Williams and The Shape of Things by Neil LaBute at the Teatro Abarico in Rome. 
2013 proved to be a turning point in Edoardo's career. He played Emiliano Lupi in the eighth season of RAI’s Un Medico in Famiglia. Edoardo’s work as Emiliano proved a resounding success with the show’s fans, seeing him continue as the character for the upcoming ninth and tenth seasons.

2014 started strongly with the February screening of comedy feature film Amore Oggi, where Edoardo played a heartbroken, obese man. Working closely with directors Giuseppe Stasi and Giancarlo Fontana – and the film being produced by SKY Cinema – 2014 continued positively.
A procession of roles followed. Acting in La mossa del Pinguino, Claudio Amendola's directing debut, was swiftly followed by starring in SKY Germany’s short film, Am Wald. 2014 also saw the screening of ARD's TV Film, Trennung auf Italienisch shown on German prime time television.

Edoardo started 2015 with a role in the new film by Claudio Fragasso La grande Rabbia, inspired by the public riots in Tor Sapienza, Rome, where he played a police officer from the Italian police department, Reparto Mobile.
Afterwards he started preparing for MGM's remake of the epic feature film, Ben-Hur. He worked with Jack Huston (Hur), Morgan Freeman, Rodrigo Santoro, Toby Kebbell and Nazanin Boniadi. Straight after Ben-Hur, Edoardo was cast by director Carlo Carlei in the World War I drama 'The Border', where he played a young Italian soldier fighting in the trenches against the Austrian army. 2015 also saw Edoardo reprise his popular role of Emiliano Lupi in RAI's 10th season of 'Un Medico in Famiglia'. The production will end in March 2016.

Edoardo currently lives and works between London, Rome and Berlin as well as continuing to build his career in the United States.

Filmography

Films

Television

Notes

External links 
 Official Site

1989 births
Living people
Italian people of German descent
Italian male actors